Natasha Soobramanien is a Mauritian novelist who received the Goldsmiths Prize in 2022 for her novel Diego Garcia.

References 

Goldsmiths Prize winners
Year of birth missing (living people)
Living people
21st-century Mauritian writers
Mauritian novelists
21st-century women writers
Mauritian women novelists